Baha is a name which is used as a given name and a surname. People with the name include:

Given name

Baha' Abdel-Rahman (born 1987), Jordanian football player
Baha Abu al-Ata (1977–2019), leader of Islamic Jihad Movement in Palestine
Baha Akşit (1914–1995), Turkish physician and politician
Baha Araji (born 1967), Iraqi politician
Baha al-Dawla (died 1012), amir of Iraq
Baha Al-Dowleh Razi (died 915), Iranian physician
Baha' Faisal (born 1995), Jordanian football player
Baha Gelenbevi (1907–1984), Turkish film director
Bahaa Hariri (born 1966), Lebanese businessman
Baha Mousa (died 2003), Iraqi hotel receptionist killed whilst in British Army custody
Bahaa Taher (born 1935), Egyptian novelist
Baha Toukan (1910–1971), Jordanian diplomat
Bahaa Trabelsi (born 1966), Moroccan novelist

Middle name
A. Baha Balantekin, Turkish physicist
Phaustin Baha Sulle (born 1982), Tanzanian long-distance runner

Surname
Alyaksey Baha (born 1981), Belarusian football player
Bahauddin Baha (born 1941), Afghan judge
Dzmitry Baha (born 1990), Belarusian football player
Huriye Baha Öniz (1887–1950), Turkish educator and politician
Nabil Baha (born 1981), Moroccan football player
Regis Baha (born 1996), Cameroonian football player

See also
 Baha' al-Din (disambiguation), list of people with the related name

Arabic masculine given names
Arabic-language surnames
Turkish masculine given names